"Citizen/Soldier" is a single by the American alternative rock band 3 Doors Down from their self-titled album 3 Doors Down. The song was released as a single in November 2007 in conjunction with a recruitment campaign by the United States National Guard. The lyrics convey the band's views regarding the actions performed by the Guard.  It was released as the third single for American active rock and mainstream rock radio stations in November 2008, while it is their fourth overall single.

A music video (directed by Antoine Fuqua) released to movie theaters, the National Guard website, and other outlets portrays the history of the Guard and employs current members of the Guard as actors. It is also  featured on the band's fourth studio album. The Citizen/Soldier promotion was also featured on the #88 Hendrick Motorsports car driven by Dale Earnhardt Jr. during the 2008 NASCAR Sprint All-Star Race on May 17, 2008. 3 Doors Down was also featured on a Busch Series car that Earnhardt owned in 2003, and was driven by Tony Stewart.

Most of the footage for the video was filmed at Camp Roberts, an active Army National Guard Base on California's Central Coast.  The Beach scenes were filmed at Morro Bay.

Charts

References

External links

3 Doors Down songs
2007 singles
Songs about the military
Propaganda in the United States
National Guard (United States)
Songs written by Brad Arnold
Songs written by Matt Roberts (musician)
Songs written by Todd Harrell
Songs written by Chris Henderson (American musician)
2007 songs
Universal Records singles
Song recordings produced by Johnny K
Music videos directed by Antoine Fuqua